Norberčany is a municipality and village in Olomouc District in the Olomouc Region of the Czech Republic. It has about 200 inhabitants.

Administrative parts
Villages of Nová Véska, Stará Libavá and Trhavice are administrative parts of Norberčany.

Gallery

References

Villages in Olomouc District